Tina Leung Kwok-hing (died 31 March 2010), also known by her stage name of Tina Ti or Di Na, was a Hong Kong actress. Her credits include A Big Mess,  One Day at a Time, Dark Rendezvous and The Warlord.

Aside from acting, she was also reportedly active in business and politics. In 2008, she acknowledged that she used to gather intelligence for the Chinese Communist Party in the 1960s.

She was diagnosed with cervical cancer in 2005. In 1998 she began the practice of Zung saang gei, which she credited with extending her life. She died in 2010, aged 65. She is survived by a son, Michael Ma.

References

External links
 Tina Ti Official Website

1940s births
2010 deaths
20th-century Chinese businesswomen
20th-century Chinese businesspeople
21st-century Chinese businesswomen
21st-century Chinese businesspeople
Hong Kong businesspeople
Hong Kong film actresses
Political commentators
Deaths from cervical cancer
Deaths from cancer in Hong Kong
Date of birth missing
Businesspeople from Guangdong
Chinese television presenters
Actresses from Guangdong
People from Xingning
Hong Kong women television presenters
Chinese women television presenters